Jaqma is a small town and rural commune in Berrechid Province of the Casablanca-Settat region of Morocco. In the 2014 Moroccan census, the commune recorded a population of 10,306 people living in 1850 households. At the time of the 2004 census, the commune had a total population of 11,511 people living in 1752 households.

References

Populated places in Berrechid Province
Rural communes of Casablanca-Settat